Baal was the first full-length play written by the German modernist playwright Bertolt Brecht. It concerns a wastrel youth who becomes involved in several sexual affairs and at least one murder. It was written in 1918, when Brecht was a 20-year-old student at Munich University, in response to the expressionist drama The Loner (Der Einsame) by the soon-to-become-Nazi dramatist Hanns Johst.

The play is written in a form of heightened prose and includes four songs and an introductory choral hymn ("Hymn of Baal the Great"), set to melodies composed by Brecht himself. Brecht wrote it prior to developing the dramaturgical techniques of epic theatre that characterize his later work, although he did re-work the play in 1926.

Characters

 Baal - poet
 Mech - merchant and publisher
 Emilie - Mech's wife
 Dr. Piller - critic
 Johannes Schmidt
 Pschierer - director of the water rates
 A Young Man
 A Young Woman
 Johanna
 Ekart
 Luise - a waitress

 The Two Sisters
 The Landlady
 Sophie Barger
 The Tramp
 Lupu
 Mjurk 
 The Nightclub Singer
 Pianist
 The Parson
 Bolleboll

 Gougou
 The Old Beggar
 Maja - the beggarwoman
 The Young Woman
 Watzmann
 A Waitress
 Two Policemen
 Drivers
 Peasants
 Woodcutters

Plot synopsis
The story charts the decline of a drunken and dissolute poet, Baal, an anti-hero who rejects the conventions and trappings of bourgeois society. This situation draws on the German Sturm und Drang tradition, which celebrates the cult of the genius living outside the conventions of society that would later destroy him. "The outcast, the disillusioned tough becomes the hero; he may be criminal, he may be semi-human," argues John Willett, "but in plays like Baal he can be romanticized into an inverted idealist, blindly striking out at the society in which he lives." 

Baal roams the countryside, womanizing and brawling. He seduces Johanna, who subsequently drowns herself. He spurns his pregnant mistress Sophie and abandons her. He murders his friend Ekart, becoming a fugitive from the police. Defiantly aloof from the consequences of his actions, Baal is nonetheless brought low by his debauchery, dying alone in a forest hut, hunted and deserted, and leaving in his wake the corpses of deflowered maidens and murdered friend.

Production history
Despite being written in 1918, Baal did not receive a theatrical performance until 1923, when it opened on 8 December at the Altes Theater in Leipzig (in a production directed by Alwin Kronacher in which Brecht participated for most rehearsals).

Brecht wrote a revised version with Elisabeth Hauptmann in 1926 for a brief production at Max Reinhardt's Deutsches Theater in Berlin, where he had worked recently as a dramaturg. It opened on the 14 February for a single matinée performance. It was performed by the Junge Bühne and directed by Brecht and Oskar Homolka (who also played the title role), with set-design by Caspar Neher.

On 17 February 1963, Baal'''s British premiere opened at the Phoenix Theatre, London, starring Peter O'Toole, directed by William Gaskill and designed by Jocelyn Herbert. The first U.S. production was presented by Circle in the Square Theatre in May 1965 at New York's Martinique Theater, directed by Gladys Vaughan and starring Mitchell Ryan.

In 1970, actor/film director/screenwriter Rainer Werner Fassbinder played the title role for a German TV production of Baal by Volker Schlöndorff where Fassbinder got to know his former star actors Margarethe von Trotta and Günther Kaufmann. 

In 1974, Dutch musician Willem Breuker wrote and recorded a 14-track, 39-minute instrumental album based on Baal. The album was entitled Ball Brecht Breuker, and released on Breuker's BVHaast label.

In 1982, musician/actor David Bowie played the title role for a BBC television production of Baal, by Alan Clarke. John Willett provided the English translation and screenplay. Bowie's recordings of the play's five songs were released as an EP, David Bowie in Bertolt Brecht's BAAL.

A 2011 production of Baal has also been staged at the Sydney Theater Company - receiving mixed reviews.

An adaptation by Jonathan Marc Sherman, about a dissipated rock star named "Clive", was performed at the New Group Theater Company in New York on January 17, 2013. It starred Ethan Hawke, Zoe Kazan, and Vincent D'Onofrio.

Notes

References
 Sacks, Glendyr. 1994. "A Brecht Calendar." In Thomson and Sacks (1994, xvii-xxvi. .
 Thomson, Peter. 1994. "Brecht's Lives". In Thomson and Sacks (1994, 22-39). 
 Thomson, Peter and Glendyr Sacks, eds. 1994. The Cambridge Companion to Brecht. Cambridge Companions to Literature Ser. Cambridge: Cambridge University Press. .
 Willett, John. 1967. The Theatre of Bertolt Brecht: A Study from Eight Aspects. Third rev. ed. London: Methuen, 1977. .
 Willett, John and Ralph Manheim. 1970. "Introduction." In Collected Plays: One'' by Bertolt Brecht. Ed. John Willett and Ralph Manheim. Bertolt Brecht: Plays, Poetry and Prose Ser. London: Methuen. . p.vii-xvii.

Plays by Bertolt Brecht
1923 plays
1926 plays